Season 13 of the Revolution series is being held from August 2015 to January 2016 in different venues across UK,  including Derby, Manchester, London and Glasgow. It consists of 6 rounds. The opening round in Derby was a special Olympic qualification event with an extended race program across four sessions in three days. The Revolution Elite Championship started from Round 2 onward.

Rounds

Current Championship standings
As of round 3 of 5

Round 1
Round 1 of this Revolution series was a special Olympic qualification event for track riders to gain UCI qualification points ahead of Rio 2016. It was represented by national team, such as Great Britain, Austria and Netherlands. The result did not count towards the final championship standings. Star riders participated in this round included triple Olympic track champion Bradley Wiggins and Jason Kenny.

Round 2 (E53)
Round 2 was the first time the Revolution series featured on Eurosport. It was also the start of this season's Revolution Elite Championship and HOY Future Stars competitions.

Start List

EV2 Flying Lap

EV8 Points Race (30km)
Only list the first 10 riders

EV11 Scratch Race (15km)
Only list the first 10 riders

EV14 Madison Time Trial

EV20 Team Elimination

Result of Round 2

Round 3 (E54)

Start List

EV2 Flying Lap

EV6 Points Race (30km)
Only list the first 10 riders

EV11 Scratch Race (15km)
Only list the first 10 riders

EV14 Madison Time Trial

EV20 Team Elimination

Results

Round 4

Round 5

Round 6

References

Revolution (cycling series)
2015 in British sport
2016 in British sport
2015 in track cycling
2016 in track cycling